Tom Stenvoll (born 27 March 1978 in Andenes) is a Norwegian football coach and former player.

Playing career
He played for Stabæk all of his professional career. Stabæk won the cup in 1998 and the league in 2008.

Managing career
After retiring following the 2010 season, Stenvoll was hired as assistant coach for Stabæk Fotball Kvinner (women) under head coach Roger Finjord. He moved home to Andenes in the summer of 2013. He started out as manager of Andenes IL. In 2018 he was also hired as coach developer in Hålogaland District of Football, which caused him to step down at Andenes following the 2018 season. Ahead of the 2021 season, he was named as manager of Lyn Fotball Damer on a two-year leave from Hålogaland. The 2022 Toppserien season entailed Lyn's highest league placement ever, but Stenvoll did not renew his contract. Dagsavisen named him Oslo coach of the year.

References

1978 births
Living people
People from Andøy
Sportspeople from Nordland
Norwegian footballers
Stabæk Fotball players
Eliteserien players
Association football fullbacks
Norwegian football managers
Stabæk Fotball non-playing staff